Stenbolone is an anabolic–androgenic steroid (AAS) of the dihydrotestosterone (DHT) group which was never marketed. A C17β ester prodrug of stenbolone, stenbolone acetate, is used as an AAS for depot intramuscular injection under the brand names Anatrofin and Stenobolone.

Chemistry

Stenbolone, also known as 2-methyl-δ1-4,5α-dihydrotestosterone (2-methyl-δ1-DHT) or as 2-methyl-5α-androst-1-en-17β-ol-3-one, is a synthetic androstane steroid and a derivative of DHT. It is closely related structurally to drostanolone (2-methyl-DHT), 1-testosterone (δ1-DHT), and methylstenbolone (17α-methylstenbolone).

Society and culture

Generic names
Stenbolone is the generic name of the drug and its .

References

Secondary alcohols
Androgens and anabolic steroids
Androstanes
Enones
World Anti-Doping Agency prohibited substances